The women's 200 metre backstroke competition of the swimming events at the 2011 Pan American Games took place on October 20 at the Scotiabank Aquatics Center in the municipality of Zapopan, near Guadalajara, Mexico.  The defending Pan American Games champion was Teresa Crippen of the United States.

This race consisted of four lengths of the pool all in backstroke.

Records
Prior to this competition, the existing world and Pan American Games records were as follows:

Qualification
Each National Olympic Committee (NOC) was able to enter up to two entrants providing they had met the A standard (2:22.8) in the qualifying period (January 1, 2010 to September 4, 2011). NOCs were also permitted to enter one athlete providing they had met the B standard (2:27.1) in the same qualifying period.

Results
All times are in minutes and seconds.

Heats
The first round was held on October 20.

B Final 
The B final was also held on October 20.

A Final 
The A final was also held on October 20.

References

Swimming at the 2011 Pan American Games
2011 in women's swimming